Michael Doran may refer to: 

Michael Doran (politician) (1827–1915), businessman and politician in Minnesota
Michael Scott Doran (born 1962), scholar of Middle Eastern politics